Bandi Sanjay Kumar (born 11 July 1971) is an Indian politician who is a Member of the Lok Sabha, the lower house of the Parliament of India, representing the Karimnagar constituency since 2019. In 2020, he was appointed the state president of the Bharatiya Janata Party in Telangana. He is a board member of the All India Institute of Medical Sciences, Bibinagar, Hyderabad, Telangana.

Early life and education 
Bandi was born on 11 July 1971 to B. Narsayya and B. Sakuntala. He completed his secondary schooling at Sri Saraswathi Shishumandir Unnata paathashaala, in Karimnagar, in 1986. Bandi was also active in the Rashtriya Swayamsevak Sangh as a youth, joining the organization at the age of twelve.

Family
Bandi has 2 sons.

Criminal activities
His eldest son, Bandi Sai Bhageerath, was involved in a viral criminal case in January 2023 in which he was accused of assaulting a fellow student at his university. Bageerath was later released on bail.

Political career 
Bandi was involved with the Akhil Bharatiya Vidyarthi Parishad, eventually became town president and a state executive member of the organization. He also occupied leadership positions in this organization, becoming "town secretary, town president, national secretary of Kerala and incharge of Tamil Nadu." In 1996, during BJP leader LK Advani's Suraj Rath Yatra, in which he campaigned across India for 35 days,

Bandi was elected a municipal corporator for Karimnagar's 48th division in 2005, and served in this role until his resignation in 2019, when he was elected to the Lok Sabha. Bandi was also fielded by the BJP in 2014 and 2018 as its candidate for the state assembly elections; he contested the Karimnagar seat both times. He was, however, unsuccessful in both elections, and lost to the Telangana Rashtra Samiti's Gangula Kamalakar.

In the 2019 Indian general election, Bandi was fielded by the BJP from the Karimnagar Lok Sabha constituency. He contested against the incumbent Member of Parliament, the Telangana Rashtra Samiti's B. Vinod Kumar, and the Indian National Congress' Ponnam Prabhakar. Bandi was elected by a margin of 89,508 votes. His election was considered something of a surprise due to the BJP's prior lack of significant strength in Telangana, as well as the fact that both his major opponents were politically well-established. With his election to the Lok Sabha, Bandi became one of four Bharatiya Janata Party MPs from Telangana, a historic first for the party. In addition to his position as an MP, Bandi serves as the president of the Telangana state unit of the BJP.

References

External links
 Official biographical sketch in Parliament of India website

India MPs 2019–present
Lok Sabha members from Telangana
Living people
Bharatiya Janata Party politicians from Telangana
1971 births
People from Karimnagar